"Carry On" is a song by Norwegian producer Kygo and British singer Rita Ora, released as a standalone single for the 2019 film, Pokémon Detective Pikachu. The song plays during the end credits of the film. The song was released on 19 April 2019, through RCA Records. The music video was released on the same day.

Background and composition
"Carry On" was written by Kygo, Rita Ora, Ilan Kidron, Natalie Dunn, Josh Cumbee and Afshin Salmani. According to Dunn and Kidron, they began writing the song in 2016 and the initial version of the song was recorded by several singers, including Kelly Rowland, Dua Lipa (featuring Swae Lee) and Charlie Puth. Ora later recorded the song with Kygo, after adding a bridge. At the time, Ora was working on the Pokémon film Detective Pikachu, and the song would go on to be featured in the end credits of the film.

EDM.com's Katie Stone wrote that "as the song progresses into the first instrumental build" an "airy tropical house beat" is introduced which "pairs beautifully with the top line." Stone also wrote that Ora's vocals get "pitched up and overlayed, creating a vibey track." The music site Run the Trap described the song as "melancholic."

Reception
John Frisica of Nintendo Enthusiast wrote that the song is "pretty chill and ethereal." Katie Stone from EDM.com praised Ora's singing as "soulful" and thought that "it's only fitting she would be included on the original soundtrack" since she appears in the film. Becca Longmire of ET Canada called the song "catchy."

Music video
While announcing the song's release on Twitter on 15 April 2019, Ora accompanied the post with film stills which the Wisconsin Gazette described as her "channelling" Detective Pikachu. The music video for the song was released on YouTube four days later, on 19 April. Directed by Jonathan Singer-Vine and produced by
Colin Tilley, the video intersperses scenes from Pokémon Detective Pikachu.

Rolling Stone wrote that the video is "set in the world of the film" and added that "Ora sports a Pikachu-yellow trenchcoat while driving around a dark city, as clips of Detective Pikachu play alongside her."

Track listing
Digital download
"Carry On (from the Original Motion Picture "POKÉMON Detective Pikachu")" – 3:35

Digital download – Remixes
"Carry On" (Nicky Romero Remix) – 2:55

Charts

Weekly charts

Year-end charts

Certifications

Release history

References

External links
 

2019 singles
2019 songs
Kygo songs
Rita Ora songs
Song recordings produced by Kygo
Songs from Pokémon
Songs written by Ilan Kidron
Songs written by Josh Cumbee
Songs written by Kygo
Songs written by Nat Dunn
Songs written by Rita Ora